Dragosavljević is a Serbian surname. Notable people with the surname include:

Marko Dragosavljević (born 1994), Serbian sprint canoer
Zlatko Dragosavljević (1967–2022), Serbian politician

Serbian surnames